The Aguascalientes Department (1865−1867) was a department of the Second Mexican Empire, located in the present-day states of Aguascalientes, Jalisco, and Zacatecas in Central Mexico.

It was established by an imperial decree on March 3, 1865, which specified:

 

The Aguascalientes Department was one of the fifty departments of the Second Mexican Empire, and was administered by the prefect Francisco R. de Esparza. The population of the department in the year 1865 was 433,151, meaning that it was the fourth-most populous department behind Puebla (3rd), Valle de México (2nd), and Guanajuato (1st).

References 

Mexican Empire
Departments
Subdivisions of Mexico
1863 establishments in Mexico
1865 disestablishments in Mexico